

Champions

Major League Baseball
 World Series: New York Giants over Cleveland Indians (4-0)
 All-Star Game, July 13 at Cleveland Stadium: American League, 11-9

Other champions
 All-American Girls Professional Baseball League: Kalamazoo Lassies
 College World Series: Missouri
 Japan Series: Chunichi Dragons over Nishitetsu Lions (4–3)
 Little League World Series: National, Schenectady, New York
Winter Leagues
1954 Caribbean Series: Criollos de Caguas
Cuban League: Alacranes del Almendares
Dominican Republic League: Estrellas Orientales
Mexican Pacific League: Venados de Mazatlán
Panamanian League: Carta Vieja Yankees
Puerto Rican League: Criollos de Caguas
Venezuelan League: Pastora de Occidente

Awards and honors
 Baseball Hall of Fame
 Rabbit Maranville
 Bill Dickey
 Bill Terry
 MLB Most Valuable Player Award
 Yogi Berra, New York Yankees, C
 Willie Mays, New York Giants, OF
 MLB Rookie of the Year Award
  Bob Grim, New York Yankees, P
 Wally Moon, St. Louis Cardinals, OF
 The Sporting News Player of the Year Award
 Willie Mays New York Giants
 The Sporting News Pitcher of the Year Award
 Bob Lemon Cleveland Indians
 Johnny Antonelli New York Giants
 The Sporting News Manager of the Year Award
 Leo Durocher New York Giants

Statistical leaders

Major League Baseball final standings

American League final standings

National League final standings

Events

January
January 12 –  The International League makes two franchise shifts, as the Triple-A Baltimore Orioles team is transferred to Richmond, Virginia, becoming the Richmond Virginians, while the Springfield Cubs moves to Havana, Cuba, becoming the Havana Sugar Kings.
January 14 – Former New York Yankees great Joe DiMaggio marries actress Marilyn Monroe in San Francisco.
January 20 – The Cleveland Indians and Washington Senators trade veteran catchers, with Joe Tipton going to Washington in exchange for Mickey Grasso.

February
February 18 –  The Washington Senators obtained All-Star first baseman Roy Sievers from the Baltimore Orioles in exchange for left fielder Gil Coan.

February 19 – The Brooklyn Dodgers signed 19-year-old Roberto Clemente to a one year deal with $5,000, including a $10,000 signing bonus. The Dodgers thus beat out a number of other clubs in the Clemente sweepstakes, as they outspent their cross-river rivals New York Giants and New York Yankees, who had already intention on inking Clemente. Besides, the Dodgers also beat the Milwaukee Braves to the punch, as they offered Clemente more money to sign there. He was assigned immediately to Triple A Montreal Royals. The future Hall of Famer put up decent but not spectacular numbers for them, posting a .257/.286/.372 batting line with ten extra base hits and one stolen base in 155 plate appearances. Unfortunately for the Dodgers, Clemente would never play a game in the organization. At the end of the season, Brooklyn left him exposed to the Rule V Draft, where he was selected by the Pittsburgh Pirates. Clemente would never play another game in the Minor Leagues.

March
March 13 – Milwaukee Braves outfielder Bobby Thomson breaks his ankle while sliding into a base during a spring training game. Thomson, whose pennant-winning three-run home run for the New York Giants in 1951 is known as the Shot Heard 'Round the World, will be out until July 14. In between, he is immediately replaced by a promising prospect named Hank Aaron.
March 29 –  Chicago Cubs manager Phil Cavarretta gives team owner Phil Wrigley an honest assessment of the chances for the Cubs during the season, and is then dismissed for his defeatist attitude. As a result, Cavarreta became the first manager ever to be given the gate during spring training. Stan Hack replaces him, even though Cavarretta is right: the Cubs will finish in seventh place this year.

April
April 11 – To make room for promising rookie outfielder Wally Moon, the St. Louis Cardinals trade longtime great Enos Slaughter to the New York Yankees in exchange for four minor leaguers, including future National League Rookie of the Year Bill Virdon.
April 13
The brand new Baltimore Orioles open in Detroit and lose to the host Detroit Tigers, 3-0. Don Larsen takes the loss against Steve Gromek. The Tigers start fast and will win 12 of their first 18 games.
First baseman Tom Alston becomes the first black player in St. Louis Cardinals history.
Second baseman Curt Roberts becomes the first black player in Pittsburgh Pirates history.
April 15 – Clint Courtney of the Baltimore Orioles hits the first home run in Baltimore's Memorial Stadium. Following a 90-minute parade, the Orioles draw an opening day record of 46,354 in a 3–1 afternoon win over the Chicago White Sox. Bob Turley strikes out nine in besting Virgil Trucks. Vern Stephens also homers for Baltimore.
April 17 – OF/1B Nino Escalera becomes the first black player in Cincinnati Reds history.
April 23 – At Sportsman's Park, Hank Aaron of the Milwaukee Braves hits his first Major League home run, off St. Louis Cardinals pitcher Vic Raschi. His first Major League hit, a double, had also been hit off Raschi, eight days earlier.

May
May 2 – At Sportsman's Park, Stan Musial of the St. Louis Cardinals hits five home runs in a doubleheader against the New York Giants. He hits three in the first game, won by the Cardinals 10-6, and adds two in the nightcap, won by the Giants 9-7. Nate Colbert of the San Diego Padres will tie Musial's record by hitting five home runs in a  doubleheader; coincidentally, he had been in attendance to watch Musial's feat.

June
June 12 – At Milwaukee County Stadium, Jim Wilson of the Milwaukee Braves no-hits the Philadelphia Phillies 2-0, besting Robin Roberts in the one-hour, 43-minute contest. The Braves score both runs on solo home runs: in the first inning by Johnny Logan and the fifth by Wilson's catcher, Del Crandall. The no-hitter is the first in the Braves' Milwaukee history; the franchise had moved from Boston after the  season.

July
July 13 – The American League makes an eighth-inning comeback at Cleveland Municipal Stadium to win the All–Star Game, 11–9.  Washington Senators rookie left-hander Dean Stone is the winning pitcher without officially facing a batter, as he throws out Red Schoendienst trying to steal home in the top of the 8th, ending that half of the inning.
July 19 – Mickey Owen of the Boston Red Sox hit a two-out, walk-off grand slam off Mike Blyzka to cap a five-run ninth inning and beat the Baltimore Orioles, 9–7, in the first game of a double header at Fenway Park. The Red Sox also won the night game 8–5.
July 25 – Jack Harshman of the Chicago White Sox set a team record by striking out 16 in a 5–2 complete game victory over the Boston Red Sox. The previous White Sox  15-strikeout mark was shared by Eddie Cicotte, Ed Walsh and Jim Scott. At the time it was the most strikeouts in Fenway Park history. The park record would stand for 32 years until Roger Clemens strike outs 20 Seattle Mariners and becomes the first pitcher in major league history to strike out 20 players in a game.
July 31 – Joe Adcock of the Milwaukee Braves hits four home runs successfully in a game, becoming the seventh player to do so in Major League history. The Braves beat the Brooklyn Dodgers, 15–7.

August

September
September 5 – During what turned out to be the All-American Girls Professional Baseball League's final game, Kalamazoo Lassies' June Peppas pitches a complete game and drives in four runs in an 8–5 victory against the Fort Wayne Daisies, to clinch the championship title. The league folds after twelve years of uninterrupted activities.
September 6 – Cuban outfielder Carlos Paula becomes the first black player in Washington Senators history.
September 29 – In Game One of the 1954 World Series, with the score tied 2–2 and two base runners in the 8th inning, New York Giants center fielder Willie Mays makes one of the greatest catches in series history, when he races back in the Polo Grounds to make an over-the-head catch of Vic Wertz' 462-foot drive. Wertz, who had driven in the Cleveland Indians' two runs in the first inning, would finish the day 4-for-5, including a double and a triple. The Giants went on to win the game in extra innings, 5–2, thanks to a pinch-hit three-run home run by Dusty Rhodes off Bob Lemon in the bottom of the 11th inning. Since then, The Catch is a term used to refer to the memorable defensive play executed by Mays.

October
October 2 – The New York Giants defeat the Cleveland Indians, 7-4, in Game 4 of the 1954 World Series to win their fifth World Championship, four games to none.  Cleveland finished the season with an American League record 111 wins which they will hold for 44 years, but failed to win a Series game.  This is the first title for the Giants in 21 years.  They would not win another World Series until 2010, more than 50 years after they moved to San Francisco.
October 28 – The Major League owners vote down the sale of the Athletics to a Philadelphia syndicate. A week later, Arnold Johnson buys a controlling interest in the Athletics from the Connie Mack family for 3.5 million dollars and moves the team to Kansas City.

November
November 22 – The Pittsburgh Pirates draft outfielder Roberto Clemente from the Triple-A roster of the Brooklyn Dodgers. Although Clemente hit only .257 for the Montreal Royals, he will become a Hall of Fame member with the Pirates.

December
December 1 – The New York Yankees and Baltimore Orioles complete the largest trade in major league history which include 17 players. The first phase of the transaction began November 18 and will conclude today after the major league draft. Baltimore send pitchers Mike Blyzka, Don Larsen and Bob Turley; catcher Darrell Johnson; outfielder Jim Fridley, and infielders Billy Hunter and Dick Kryhoski  to the Yankees, in exchange for pitchers Harry Byrd, Jim McDonald and Bill Miller; catchers Hal Smith and Gus Triandos; infielders Don Leppert, Willy Miranda and Kal Segrist; outfielder Gene Woodling, and minor leaguer Ted Del Guercio. Del Guercio, an outfielder who played 12 minor league seasons, was the only member of the group not to make the Majors.

Births

January
January 5 – John Littlefield
January 8 – Yasushi Tao
January 13 – Steve Comer
January 14 – Danny Boone
January 15 – George Cappuzzello
January 16 – Dave Stapleton
January 17 – Jerry Turner
January 18 – Scott McGregor
January 19 – Rich Gale
January 23 – Garry Hancock
January 24 – Timothy Jones
January 26 – Blake Doyle
January 26 – Brian Doyle
January 30 – Joe Kerrigan
January 30 – Dave Stegman

February
February   1 – Mark Souza
February   2 – Puchy Delgado
February   2 – Rob Dressler
February   2 – John Tudor
February   4 – Al Javier
February   8 – Joe Maddon
February 10 – Larry McWilliams
February 13 – Donnie Moore
February 17 – Mike Macha
February 24 – Dave Edwards
February 25 – Bob Brenly
February 26 – Jeff Yurak
February 28 – John Poloni

March
March   4 – Mark Wagner
March   7 – Mike Armstrong
March   7 – Nyls Nyman
March   8 – Win Remmerswaal
March 12 – Larry Rothschild
March 13 – Randy Bass
March 13 – Terry Leach
March 16 – Dan Duran
March 20 – Steve McCatty
March 20 – Paul Mirabella
March 29 – Mike Ramsey
March 29 – Tom Tellmann

April
April   3 – Larry Littleton
April   6 – Ken Clay
April   8 – Gary Carter
April 11 – Willie Royster
April 14 – Craig Mitchell
April 14 – Casey Parsons
April 16 – Bruce Robinson
April 17 – Denny Walling
April 20 – Doug Clarey
April 20 – Mike O'Berry
April 22 – Dan O'Brien
April 22 – Bill Paschall
April 25 – Craig Minetto
April 25 – Greg Wells
April 29 – Danny Garcia
April 30 – Joe Strain

May
May   1 – Roy Lee Jackson
May   2 – Keith Moreland
May   2 – Steve Rippley
May   6 – Albert Williams
May   9 – Tom Chism
May   9 – George Enright
May 19 – Rick Cerone
May 22 – Mark Mercer
May 24 – Bobby Brown
May 25 – Bob Knepper
May 26 – Kevin Kennedy
May 31 – Greg Erardi

June
June   5 – Dennis Blair
June   8 – Lenn Sakata
June 19 – Johnnie LeMaster
June 20 – Tony Chévez
June 25 – Bob Shirley
June 29 – Rick Honeycutt

July
July   4 – Jim Beattie
July   4 – Dan Larson
July   6 – Willie Randolph
July   6 – Jason Thompson
July 10 – Andre Dawson
July 14 – Chuck Rainey
July 16 – Jim Lentine
July 18 – Harry Spilman
July 19 – Dan Graham
July 20 – Gary Woods 
July 27 – Brian Kingman
July 30 – Ellis Valentine

August
August   1 – Roger Miller
August   6 – Ken Phelps
August   7 – Steve Kemp
August   7 – Yasuyuki Nakai
August   8 – Mark Ross
August 11 – Gary Holle
August 14 – Mark Fidrych
August 19 – Reggie Baldwin
August 19 – Ned Yost
August 21 – Bruce Berenyi
August 24 – Chris Batton
August 25 – Pete Redfern
August 31 – Jack Perconte
August 31 – Claudell Washington

September
September   2 – John Flinn
September   2 – Rick Manning
September   6 – Steve Macko
September   7 – Craig Eaton
September   7 – John Hirschbeck
September   8 – Don Aase
September   8 – Jim Smith
September 10 – Craig Cacek
September 10 – Preston Hanna
September 13 – John Harris
September 13 – Billy Smith
September 16 – Dave Koza
September 17 – Wayne Krenchicki
September 20 – Bob Detherage
September 20 – Mickey Klutts
September 21 – Frank MacCormack
September 22 – Hal Dues
September 27 – Len Matuszek

October
October   3 – Dennis Eckersley
October   3 – Joe Gates
October   3 – Bert Roberge
October   4 – Bill Atkinson
October   4 – Dennis Littlejohn
October   6 – Roger Weaver
October   9 – Randy Lerch
October 12 – Garth Iorg
October 12 – Gil Kubski
October 13 – George Frazier 
October 14 – Willie Aikens
October 15 – Glenn Gulliver
October 16 – Chris Bourjos
October 16 – Mike Dimmel
October 21 – Keith Drumright
October 22 – Jamie Quirk
October 23 – John Castino
October 25 – Tito Landrum
October 28 – Gary Rajsich
October 28 – Sammy Stewart
October 29 – Kip Young

November
November   1 – Miguel Diloné
November   8 – Gary Lucas
November   9 – Al Greene
November 10 – Bob Stanley
November 11 – Bob Long
November 11 – Ron Musselman
November 14 – Willie Hernández
November 18 – Craig Stimac
November 21 – Alan Hargesheimer
November 21 – Gary Wilson
November 23 – Glenn Brummer
November 23 – Broderick Perkins
November 23 – Ken Schrom
November 30 – Juan Berenguer

December
December   1 – Dan Schatzeder
December   2 – Julio Cruz
December   4 – Tucker Ashford
December   5 – Gary Roenicke
December   6 – Mike Parrott
December 11 – Bob Sykes
December 22 – Sheldon Burnside
December 22 – Ken Landreaux
December 25 – Jeff Little
December 26 – Ozzie Smith

Deaths

January
January   5 – Rabbit Maranville, 62, Hall of Fame shortstop and second baseman for five National League clubs over 23 years between 1912 and 1935, a diminutive and rambunctious character who had the range to top middle infielders in putouts (six times), assists (four), double plays (five), and fielding average (three), as well as the cleanup hitter of the 1914 Boston Braves Miracle Team, who after being in last place on the Fourth of July, rallied and posted a 68–19 record to win the National League pennant and then, as heavy underdogs, swept the heavily favored Philadelphia Athletics in four straight games to clinch the 1914 World Series.
January   7 – Red Schillings, 53, relief pitcher in four games for the 1922 Philadelphia Athletics.
January   9 – Skeeter Shelton, 65, outfielder who played the New York Yankees in the 1915 season, and later served as a baseball coach in West Virginia University from 1918 to 1920 and at Marshall University from 1922 to 1923.
January 11 – Sumner Bowman, 86, pitcher who played from 1890 to 1891 for the Philadelphia Phillies, Pittsburgh Alleghenys and Philadelphia Athletics.
January 16 – Clay Perry, 72, third baseman for the Detroit Tigers in their 1908 season.
January 16 – Fred Payne, 73, catcher who played from 1906 through 1911 for the Detroit Tigers and Chicago White Sox.
January 20 – Bunny Madden, 71, catcher for the Boston Red Sox and Philadelphia Phillies between 1909 and 1911.

February
February   1 – Norman Plitt, 60, pitcher who played with the Brooklyn Robins and New York Giants in part of two seasons spanning 1918–1927.
February   4 – Ollie Smith, 88, outfielder who played for the Louisville Colonels in the 1894 season.
February   5 – Ed Warner, 64, pitcher for the 1912 Pittsburgh Pirates.
February 10 – Heinie Berger, 72, one of the many German baseball players in the early part of the 20th century, who pitched from 1905 through 1910 for the Cleveland Naps of the American League. 
February 13 – Walter Ancker, 60, pitcher who played briefly for the Philadelphia Athletics in the 1915 season.
February 15 – John Callahan, 79, pitcher for the St. Louis Browns of the National League in the 1898 season.
February 15 – John Gillespie,  53, pitcher who appeared in 31 games for the Cincinnati Reds during the 1922 season.
February 16 – Red Parnell, 48, All-Star left fielder and manager in the Negro leagues, most notably for the Philadelphia Stars club from 1936 to 1943.
February 20 – Sadie McMahon, 86, 19th century pitcher who played for the Philadelphia Athletics, Baltimore Orioles and Brooklyn Bridegrooms in a span of nine seasons from 1889 through 1897, sporting a 173-127 record and a 3.51 ERA in 351 games, while leading the American Association in wins (36), strikeouts (291), games pitched (60) and innings (509) during the 1890 season. 
February 22 – Chief Wilson, 70, outfielder best known for setting the single-season record for triples in 1912 with 36, a record that still stands, who played for the Pittsburgh Pirates and St. Louis Cardinals during nine seasons from 1908–1916, and was also a member of the 1909 World Series Champion Pirates.

March
March   1 – Marv Gudat, 50, utility first baseman and outfielder in 69 games for the Cincinnati Reds in the 1929 season and the Chicago Cubs in 1932.
March 10 – George Textor, 67, catcher who played for the Indianapolis Hoosiers and Newark Peppers of the outlaw Federal League over parts of two seasons from 1914–1915.
March 11 – Bill Bradley, 76, third baseman for the Cleveland Bluebirds in the inaugural game of the American League in 1901, who was recognized as one of the best third basemen in baseball prior to 1950, along with Jimmy Collins and Pie Traynor, while leading during the first seven years of the league in fielding average four times, three times in double plays, twice in putouts, and once in assists, setting a league record of seven putouts in one game in both 1901 and 1909, also batting .300 or better three consecutive years and becoming the first player to hit one home run in four straight games in 1902, a record not matched until Babe Ruth did it in the 1918 season. 
March 12 – J. A. Robert Quinn, 84, executive; principal owner of the Boston Red Sox from 1923 to 1933 and the Boston Braves from 1936 to 1945; also served as business manager of St. Louis Browns and general manager of Brooklyn Dodgers; patriarch of a four-generation baseball family.
March 16 – George Grantham, 53,  second baseman for the Chicago Cubs, Pittsburgh Pirates, Cincinnati Reds and New York Giants in a span of 13 seasons from 1922–1934, who hit over .300 every season from 1924 to 1931, and also was a member of the Pirates teams that won the World Series in 1925 and the National League pennant in 1927.
March 19 – Charlie Babb, 81, shortstop who played from 1903 through 1905 for the New York Giants and Brooklyn Superbas, managing later in the Minor Leagues from 1906 to 1913.
March 19 – Frank Fahey, 58, left fielder and pitcher for the 1918 Philadelphia Athletics.
March 22 – Harry LaRoss, 66, outfielder who played for the Cincinnati Reds in 1914.  
March 24 – Chubby Snyder, 63, Danish and German American catcher who appeared in just one game in 1914 with the Buffalo Buffeds of the Federal League.

April
April 15 – Chick Holmes, 58, pitcher for the Philadelphia Athletics during the 1918 season.
April 19 – Red Gunkel, 60, pitcher who played in 1916 for the Cleveland Indians.

May
May   4 – Otto McIvor, 69, outfielder for the 1911 St. Louis Cardinals.
May   7 – Les Channell, 68, backup outfielder who played with the New York Highlanders in the 1910 season and for the New York Yankees in 1914.
May 10 – Eddie Files, 70, pitcher who played with the Philadelphia Athletics during the 1908 season.
May 11 – Dorsey Riddlemoser, 78, pitcher for the 1899 Washington Senators.
May 17 – Roy Parker, 58, pitcher who played briefly for the St. Louis Cardinals in the 1919 season, just after serving in the United States Navy during World War I. 
May 17 – Earl Tyree, 64, catcher for the 1914 Chicago Cubs.
May 22 – Chief Bender, 70, Hall of Fame Native American pitcher who won 212 games and hurled a no-hitter, while starring for three Philadelphia Athletics World Series Champion teams, being also the first pitcher in a World Series of six games to throw three complete games.
May 23 – Bill Davidson, 70, outfielder who played with the Chicago Cubs in 1909, and for the Brooklyn Superbas and Dodgers teams from 1910 to 1911. 
May 24 – Charlie Biggs, 47, pitcher who played for the Chicago White Sox in 1932.

June
June   1 – George Caithamer, 43, catcher for the 1934 Chicago White Sox.
June   1 – Vern Duncan, 64, center fielder who played with the Philadelphia Phillies in 1913 and for the Baltimore Terrapins from 1914 to 1915.
June   3 – Zaza Harvey, 75, outfielder who played from 1900 through 1902 for the Chicago Orphans, Chicago White Sox and Cleveland Bronchos.
June   8 – Tom O'Hara, 73, outfielder for the St. Louis Cardinals in the 1906 and 1907 seasons.
June 15 – Lew Carr, 81, utility infielder for the 1901 Pittsburgh Pirates. 
June 23 – Red Massey, 63, outfielder who played with the Boston Braves in the 1918 season.
June 26 – Charlie Pick, 66, infielder who played with four different teams in part of six seasons spanning 1914–1920, most notably for the 1918 National League champion Chicago Cubs.

July
July   8 – Wiley Taylor, 66, pitcher who played from 1911 through 1914 for the Detroit Tigers, Chicago White Sox and St. Louis Browns.
July 13 – Ed Porray, 65, pitcher for the  Buffalo Buffeds, who is best known as being the only Major League player born at sea.
July 13 – Grantland Rice, 73, "The Dean of American Sportswriters"; though famed for his football reportage, his baseball coverage made him a posthumous recipient of the 1966 J. G. Taylor Spink Award.
July 15 – Chris Mahoney, 69, pitcher and outfielder for the 1910 Boston Red Sox.
July 16 – Jack Bracken, 73, pitcher who played for the Cleveland Blues in 1901.
July 28 – Jim Bagby, 64, Cleveland Indians star pitcher who led the American League with 31 victories in 1920, defeating the Detroit Tigers, 10–1, in a clinching game for the pennant, then defeating the Brooklyn Robins in the 1920 World Series, 8–1, while hitting the first home run by a pitcher in World Series history, en route to a world championship for the Indians.
July 29 – Babe Borton, 65, first baseman who played for the Chicago White Sox, New York Yankees, St. Louis Terriers and St. Louis Browns in part of four seasons between 1912 and 1916.

August
August   3 – Art Hoelskoetter, 71, utility man who played all nine positions in his four seasons for the St. Louis Cardinals from 1905–1908, though he played at least 15 games at all the positions, except only one game in left field.
August 14 – Fabian Kowalik, 46, who pitched with four teams in a span of three seasons from 1932–1936, mainly for the 1935 NL Champion Chicago Cubs. 
August 29 – Jack Ferry, 67, pitcher for the Pittsburgh Pirates from 1910 to 1913.

September
September   1 – Wimpy Quinn, 36, pitcher for the Chicago Cubs in 1941, who later played and managed in the Minor Leagues with the Bakersfield Indians.
September   2 – Fred Osborn, 70, center fielder for the Philadelphia Phillies over parts of three seasons from 1907–1909.
September   5 – Maurice Archdeacon, 55, center fielder who played from 1923 through 1925 for the Chicago White Sox; as a minor-leaguer, scored 166, 151 and 162 runs in successive International League seasons (1921–1923).	
September 13 – Roy Grimes, 61, twin brother of first baseman Ray Grimes, who played briefly for the New York Giants in their 1920 season.
September 21 – Herbie Moran, 70, right fielder who played with four clubs in a span of seven seasons from 1908–1915, most prominently for the 1914 Boston Braves Miracle Team, who, as heavy underdogs, won the National League pennant and later swept the heavily favored Philadelphia Athletics in four straight games to clinch the 1914 World Series.
September 23 – John Wilson, 64, who pitched in three games for the Washington Senators during its 1913 season.

October
October   5 – Oscar Charleston, 57, Hall of Fame Negro leagues outfielder and manager, a powerful hitter who could hit to all fields and bunt, steal a hundred bases a year, hit over .300 consistently, and cover center field as well as anyone.
October   6 – Josh Devore, 66, outfielder for the Cincinnati Reds, Philadelphia Phillies, New York Giants and Boston Braves during seven season from 1908 to 1914, who arrived in time for the Miracle Braves stretch run which saw them win the National League pennant and the 1914 World Series.
October 12 – Walter Holke, 61, first baseman for the New York Giants, Boston Braves, Philadelphia Phillies and Cincinnati Reds in part of 11 seasons spanning 1914–1925, who holds the record for the most fielding chances by a player in a game with 43, 42 put-outs and one assist during a 26-inning, 1–1 tie game between the Boston Braves and the Brooklyn Robins on May 1, 1920.
October 14 – Bill Swanson, 66, backup infielder for the 1914 Boston Red Sox.
October 19 – Dave Davenport, 64, pitcher for the Cincinnati Reds, St. Louis Terriers and St. Louis Browns from 1914 through 1919, who posted a 22-18 record and 2.20 ERA while playing for the Terriers of the Federal League in 1915, leading also the league in games (55), starts (46), complete games (30), shutouts (10), strikeouts (229) and innings (392).
October 19 – Hugh Duffy, 87, Hall of Fame center fielder who posted an all-time record .438 batting average in 1894, one of the top hitters of the 1890s that recorded more hits, home runs and runs batted in than any other player in the game, while also teaming with fellow Hall of Famer Tommy McCarthy to form the called Heavenly Twins outfield tandem for the Boston Beaneaters, which captured two National League pennants and a pre-modern World Series Championship in 1892 and 1893.
October 21 – Art Gardiner, 54, pitcher who appeared in just one game with the Philadelphia Phillies in the 1923 season.
October 22 – Earl Whitehill, 55, dominant left-handed pitcher with four teams from 1923 to 1939, while helping the Washington Senators win the American League pennant in 1933, whose 218 career wins ranks him 79th in Major League history.

November
November   7 – Art Bues, 66, third baseman who played with the Boston Braves in the 1913 season and for the Chicago Cubs in 1914.
November   7 – Charlie Frisbee, 80, backup outfielder for the Boston Beaneaters and New York Giants between 1899 and 1900.
November 20 – Hod Fenner, 57, pitcher who played for the Chicago White Sox in the 1921 season.
November 21 – Uel Eubanks, 51, pitcher for the 1922 Chicago Cubs. 	
November 22 – Charlie Gibson, 75, catcher who played in 1905 for the Philadelphia Athletics.
November 26 – Bill Doak, 63, pitcher for three different clubs in a span of sixteen seasons from 1912–1929, eleven of them with the St. Louis Cardinals, who won 20 games in 1920 and twice led the National League in ERA in 1914 and 1921.
 November 27 – Nick Maddox, 68, pitcher who posted a 43-20 record and 2.29 earned run average from 1907–1910 for the Pittsburgh Pirates, who threw a two-hit, 14-strikeout 4–0 shutout in his debut against the St. Louis Cardinals, and later in the season hurled a 2–1 no-hitter against the Brooklyn Superbas, becoming the youngest pitcher ever to throw a no-hitter in Major League history at the age of 20 years and ten months, which was also the first no-hit game ever thrown by a Pittsburgh Pirates pitcher.
November 29 – Al Lawson, 85, pitcher for the Boston Beaneaters and Pittsburgh Alleghenys during the 1890 season, who later went on to play a pioneering role in the U.S. aircraft industry.

December
December   1 – Kid O'Hara, 78, outfielder for the Boston Beaneaters in the 1904 season.
December   4 – Tony Madigan, 86, pitcher for the 1886 Washington Nationals of the National League. 
December   5 – Russ Christopher, 37, pitcher who played from 1942 through 1948 with the Philadelphia Athletics and Cleveland Indians, including the 1948 World Champion Indians.	
December   9 – Bill McGowan, 58, Hall of Fame American League umpire who officiated over 30 years and worked in eight World Series, including a string of 2,541 consecutive games in which he did not miss a single inning between 1925 and 1942.
December 11 – Harry Courtney, 56, who pitched from 1919 to 1922 for the Washington Senators and Chicago White Sox.	
December 17 – Red Proctor, 54, pitcher who saw action in two games with the Chicago White Sox in 1923.	
December 19 – Big Jeff Pfeffer, 72, National League pitcher for the Chicago Cubs and the Boston Beaneaters/Doves/Rustlers teams, who pitched his way into baseball history by throwing a no-hitter against the Cincinnati Reds on May 8, 1907.
December 31 – Tom Raftery, 73, outfielder who appeared in eight games for the Cleveland Naps in the 1909 season.

Sources

External links

Major League Baseball official website
Minor League Baseball official website
Baseball Reference – 1954 MLB Season Summary
Baseball Almanac - Major League Baseball Players Who Were Born in 1954
Baseball Almanac - Major League Baseball Players Who Died in 1954